Kevin Haroldo Cordón Buezo (born November 28, 1986) is a Guatemalan badminton player. He won two men's singles title at the Pan American Games, four title at the Pan Am Championships (3 in singles and 1 in doubles), and six title at the Central American and Caribbean Games (4 in singles and 2 in doubles). He is a four time Olympian for Guatemala participating at the 2008, 2012, 2016 and the 2020 Olympic Games.

Career 
Born in La Unión, Zacapa, Cordón was named after former England international footballer Kevin Keegan, of whom his father was a fan. In spite of badminton not being popular in Guatemala during his childhood, he became a badminton player as he thought it would give him a better chance of one day becoming an Olympian than if he played a different sport, being the first member of his family to practice the sport. He began playing at the age of 11 and by 1998 he was a part of the Zacapa Department's youth team.

After winning the silver medal at the 2007 Pan American Games, Cordón qualified to the 2008 Olympic Games, and was selected as the flag bearer of his nation's Olympic team. At the Beijing Games he lost against the #3 seeded player, Bao Chunlai from China.

At the 2010 Central American and Caribbean Games, he won three gold medals in the singles, doubles, and team events, being the Guatemalan athlete with the most medals won during the games.

Cordón then competed at the 2011 BWF World Championships in London where he reached the quarterfinals after beating fifth seeded Chen Long from China, Henri Hurskainen from Sweden and Pablo Abian from Spain to face the tournament's top seeded Lee Chong Wei. There he lost to the Malaysian player in two straight sets.

Cordón was selected as the flag bearer for the Guatemalan team at the opening ceremony of the 2011 Pan American Games, and was also the top seeded player in the men's singles event. On October 20, 2011, he won his first Pan-American Games gold medal by beating Cuban competitor Osleni Guerrero in the final. Cordón did not lose one set in the tournament. In 2015, he successfully defended his men's singles Pan Am Games title at the Atos Markham Pan Am Centre in Toronto at the Pan American Games beating Canadian Andrew D'Souza 21–13, 21–14 in the final.

Cordón qualified for the 2012 Summer Olympics singles competition. He won both of his group matches beating 15th seed Englishman Rajiv Ouseph and Swedish player Henri Hurskainen in the process, thus winning a place in the round of 16. He lost his round of 16 match versus Sho Sasaki of Japan. He qualified again to the 2016 Summer Olympics, but had to withdraw due to injury after finishing the first match losing a tough 3-setter against Adrian Dziolko of Poland.

Cordón qualified again for the 2020 Summer Olympics. He won both of his group matches, defeating Mexican Lino Munoz and the 8th-seeded Ng Ka Long, thus winning a place in the round of 16. He defeated Mark Caljouw of the Netherlands to advance to the quarter-finals for the first time ever. In the quarter-finals, he defeated Korean Heo Kwang-hee 21–13 and 21–18 to become the first Central American to advance to the Olympic badminton semi-finals. He lost the semi-final to eventual gold medalist Viktor Axelsen of Denmark and the bronze medal match to Indonesian Anthony Sinisuka Ginting, both on straight games.

Kevin Cordón twice won the continental Pan Am Badminton Championships in the men's singles event in 2009 and 2012 and also once the men's doubles Pan Am badminton event in 2009 with compatriot Rodolfo Ramirez.

Already as a junior player in 2004 he won the continental Pan Am Junior Badminton Championships boys' singles title in the U-19 category.

Achievements

Pan American Games 
Men's singles

Pan Am Championships 
Men's singles

Men's doubles

Central American and Caribbean Games 
Men's singles

Men's doubles

BWF International Challenge/Series (40 titles, 17 runner-up) 
Men's singles

Men's doubles

  BWF International Challenge tournament
  BWF International Series tournament
  BWF Future Series tournament

Record against selected opponents 
Includes results against CACSO Games finalists, Pan Am Games finalists, Pan Am Championships finalists, Super Series finalists, World Championship semifinalists, Olympic quarter-finalists, and all Olympic opponents.

  Ygor Coelho 4–1
  Mike Beres 0–1
  Andrew D'Souza 1–0
  Jason Ho-Shue 2–2
  Brian Yang 1–5
  Stephan Wojcikiewicz 3–0
  Bao Chunlai 0–1
  Chen Long 1–0
  Osleni Guerrero 10–5
  Ilian Perez 0–1
  Jan Fröhlich 1–3
  Peter Gade 0–1
  Joachim Persson 1–1
  Viktor Axelsen 0–1
  Rajiv Ouseph 1–1
  Marc Zwiebler 0–2
  Pedro Yang 2–0
  Ng Ka Long 1–0
  Ajay Jayaram 0–2
  Parupalli Kashyap 0–1
  Anthony Sinisuka Ginting 0–1
  Taufik Hidayat 0–1
  Kento Momota 0–1
  Sho Sasaki 0–2
  Lee Chong Wei 0–2
  Lino Muñoz 14–1
  Mark Caljouw 1–1
  Adrian Dziółko 2–1
  Heo Kwang-hee 1–0
  Lee Hyun-il 0–1
  Pablo Abián 2–7
  Niluka Karunaratne 2–1
  Henri Hurskainen 2–2
  Boonsak Ponsana 0–1
  Howard Shu 9–0
  Nguyễn Tiến Minh 1–0

References

External links 

 
 
 

1986 births
Living people
People from Zacapa Department
Guatemalan male badminton players
Badminton players at the 2008 Summer Olympics
Badminton players at the 2012 Summer Olympics
Badminton players at the 2016 Summer Olympics
Badminton players at the 2020 Summer Olympics
Olympic badminton players of Guatemala
Badminton players at the 2003 Pan American Games
Badminton players at the 2007 Pan American Games
Badminton players at the 2011 Pan American Games
Badminton players at the 2015 Pan American Games
Badminton players at the 2019 Pan American Games
Pan American Games gold medalists for Guatemala
Pan American Games silver medalists for Guatemala
Pan American Games bronze medalists for Guatemala
Pan American Games medalists in badminton
Medalists at the 2007 Pan American Games
Medalists at the 2011 Pan American Games
Medalists at the 2015 Pan American Games
Medalists at the 2019 Pan American Games
Competitors at the 2002 Central American and Caribbean Games
Competitors at the 2006 Central American and Caribbean Games
Competitors at the 2010 Central American and Caribbean Games
Competitors at the 2014 Central American and Caribbean Games
Competitors at the 2018 Central American and Caribbean Games
Central American and Caribbean Games gold medalists for Guatemala
Central American and Caribbean Games silver medalists for Guatemala
Central American and Caribbean Games bronze medalists for Guatemala
Central American and Caribbean Games medalists in badminton